Cataluña is the Spanish name for Catalonia

Cataluña, Op. 47, No. 2, is a composition by Isaac Albéniz. It premiered as a piano performance in Paris in January 1899. Since it has been transcribed for classical guitar by Miguel Llobet, it has become one of the staples of classical guitar music. It has been performed and recorded by guitarists such as Julian Bream, John Williams, Milos Janjic, Charles Mokotoff and many others. It is usually played in the key of G minor.

References

External links
 Guitar video of Cataluña, by Charles Mokotoff
 Piano recording of Cataluña by Juan Ignacio Machi

Compositions by Isaac Albéniz
1899 compositions
Spanish compositions for solo piano
Compositions for guitar